An election to South Pembrokeshire District Council was held in May 1991. The Independents maintained a majority. It was preceded by the 1987 election and followed by the 1995 Pembrokeshire County Council election (following re-organization of local government). On the same day there were elections to the other local authorities and community councils in Wales.

Results

Amroth (one seat)

Begelly (one seat)

Carew (one seat)

East Williamston (one seat)

Hundleton (one seat)

Lampeter Velfrey (one seat)

Lamphey(one seat)

Manorbier(one seat)

Martletwy (one seat)

Narberth Rural (one seat)

Narberth Urban(one seat)

Pembroke St Mary (two seats)

Pembroke St Michael (two seats)

Pembroke Dock Central (one seat)

Pembroke Dock Llanion (two seats)

Pembroke Dock Market (one seat)

Pembroke Dock Pennar (two seats)

Penally(one seat)

Saundersfoot (two seats)

Stackpole (one seat)

Tenby (four seats)

References

1991
1991 Welsh local elections